William Murrell Jr. (1845 - 1932) served in the Union Army during the American Civil War and became a state legislator in Louisiana. He edited the ''Madison Vindicator.

He represented Madison Parish in the Louisiana House of Representatives from 1872 to 1876 and 1879 to 1880.

He opposed the exodus of African Americans to Kansas (exodusters).

References

1845 births
1932 deaths
People of Louisiana in the American Civil War
Union Army soldiers
Members of the Louisiana House of Representatives
People from Madison Parish, Louisiana
Editors of Louisiana newspapers
19th-century American politicians
19th-century American newspaper editors